Karl Ludwig von Urlichs (November 9, 1813 – November 3, 1889) was a German philologist and archaeologist born in Osnabrück. He was the father of archaeologist Heinrich Ludwig Urlichs (1864-1935).

He received his education at the University of Bonn, where he was a student of Friedrich Gottlieb Welcker (1784-1868). Afterwards he travelled throughout Sicily and Italy; in Rome he collaborated with other German scholars on the multi-volume Beschreibung der Stadt Rom (1829–1842). In 1840 he returned to Bonn, where in 1841 he was co-founder and first chronicler of the Vereins von Altertumsfreunden im Rheinlande. In 1844 he became an associate professor at the University of Bonn.

In 1847 he was appointed professor of classical philology at the University of Greifswald, subsequently becoming a member of the Preußischen Abgeordnetenhauses (Prussian House of Representatives) and of the Erfurt Union. In 1855 he relocated to the University of Würzburg as chair of classical philology and aesthetics. He specialized in classical pottery and ancient sculpture, and at Würzburg was in charge of the large collection of art and antiques at the Martin von Wagner Museum.

He died in Würzburg.

Among his numerous publications was an important work on the landmarks of ancient Rome titled Codex Urbis Romae topographicus (1871), and an 1863 monograph on the life and works of the Greek sculptor Skopas called Skopas: Leben und Werke.

Selected publications 
 Achaei Eretriensis quae supersunt, dissertation Bonn 1834 
 Disputatio critica de numeris et nominibus propriis in Plinii Naturali historia, Würzburg 1857  
 Skopas: Leben und Werke, Greifswald 1863 
 Mitarbeit bei dem Lexikon: Dictionary of Greek and Roman biography and mythology, Boston 1867
 Codex Urbis Romae topographicus, 1871
 Die Anfänge der griechischen Kuenstlergeschichte, Würzburg 1871  
 Pergamon: Geschichte und Kunst, Leipzig 1883

References 
 This article is based on a translation of an equivalent article at the German Wikipedia, who references include: Urlichs, Karl Ludwig In: Allgemeine Deutsche Biographie (ADB). Band 39, Duncker & Humblot, Leipzig 1895, S. 353–355.

Archaeologists from Lower Saxony
German philologists
1813 births
1889 deaths
People from Osnabrück
Academic staff of the University of Würzburg
Academic staff of the University of Greifswald